Gomalia elma, also known as the marbled skipper or African marbled skipper, is a species of hesperiid butterfly. It is found in Africa and parts of Asia.

Description

The wingspan is 26–31 mm for males and 29–36 mm for females.

Distribution
In Africa, Gomalia elma is found inSouth Africa (the Cape region, and Free State), Botswana, Zimbabwe, Mozambique, and other parts of Africa. In Asia, the butterfly ranges from Saudi Arabia, Sri Lanka, Pakistan (Baluchistan) and India.

Food plants

 Abutilon indicum
 Abutilon sonneratianum

Subspecies
Gomalia elma elma (Africa)
Gomalia elma albofasciata Moore, 1879 (India, Ceylon)
Gomalia elma levana Benyamini, 1990 (Dead Sea valley in Israel and Jordan)

Cited references

See also
Hesperiidae
List of butterflies of India (Pyrginae)
List of butterflies of India (Hesperiidae)

References

Print

Online

Carcharodini
Monotypic butterfly genera
Fauna of Pakistan
Butterflies described in 1862
Taxa named by Roland Trimen